In the Clutches of the Ku Klux Klan is a 1913 American silent film produced by Gene Gauntier Feature Players and distributed by Warner's Features. It was directed by Sidney Olcott with himself, Gene Gauntier and Jack J. Clark in the leading roles.

Cast
 Gene Gauntier 
 Jack J. Clark 
 Alf Hollingsworth

Production notes
 The film was shot in Jacksonville, Florida.

External links

 In the Clutches of the Ku Klux Klan website dedicated to Sidney Olcott

1913 films
American silent short films
Films shot in Jacksonville, Florida
Films directed by Sidney Olcott
1910s thriller films
American black-and-white films
American thriller films
1910s American films
Silent thriller films